The 1967–68 Athenian League season was the 45th in the history of Athenian League. The league consisted of 48 teams.

Premier Division

The division featured two new teams, both promoted from last season's Division One:
 Hornchurch  (1st)
 Redhill (2nd)

League table

Division One

The division featured 4 new teams:
 2 relegated from last season's Premier Division:
 Worthing (15th)
 Edgware Town  (16th)
 2 promoted from last season's Division Two:
 Eastbourne United (1st)
 Ware (2nd)

League table

Division Two

The division featured two new teams, both relegated from last season's Division One:
 Uxbridge (15th)
 Harrow Borough (16th)

League table

References

1967–68 in English football leagues
Athenian League